Hands of Murder (also known as Hands of Mystery and Hands of Destiny) is an American mystery/anthology series that aired on the DuMont Television Network.

Broadcast history
Initially titled Hands of Destiny, the show aired from August 24, 1949, to December 11, 1951, and was a prime time mystery/anthology series. The title changed to Hands of Mystery with the September 8, 1950, broadcast.

The show, produced by Lawrence Menkin, aired Fridays at 8pm ET during the 1949-50 season, Fridays at 9pm ET during the 1950-51 season, and Tuesdays at 10pm ET during the 1951-52 season.

Episodes
July 9, 1950 - "Too Old to Live"

See also
List of programs broadcast by the DuMont Television Network
List of surviving DuMont Television Network broadcasts
1949-50 United States network television schedule
1950-51 United States network television schedule
1951-52 United States network television schedule

References

Bibliography
David Weinstein, The Forgotten Network: DuMont and the Birth of American Television (Philadelphia: Temple University Press, 2004) 
Alex McNeil, Total Television, Fourth edition (New York: Penguin Books, 1980) 
Tim Brooks and Earle Marsh, The Complete Directory to Prime Time Network TV Shows, Third edition (New York: Ballantine Books, 1964)

External links
 
 Hands of Murder at CTVA
 DuMont historical website
 Episode list at CVTA

1949 American television series debuts
1951 American television series endings
1940s American anthology television series
1950s American anthology television series
1940s American mystery television series
1950s American mystery television series
Black-and-white American television shows
DuMont Television Network original programming
English-language television shows
Lost television shows